Eric Kaiser (born 7 March 1971) is a retired Cameroonian-born German athlete who specialised in the sprint hurdles. He represented his country at the 1996 Summer Olympics as well as two World Championships. Earlier in his career he competed in the decathlon.

His personal bests are 13.34 seconds in the 110 metres hurdles (-0.7 m/s, Duisburg 1995) and 7.65 seconds in the 60 metres hurdles (Stuttgart 1995).

In 1999 he tested positive for a banned substance, clenbuterol, and was suspended for two years.

References

1971 births
Living people
German male hurdlers
Athletes (track and field) at the 1996 Summer Olympics
Olympic athletes of Germany
World Athletics Championships athletes for Germany
German people of Cameroonian descent
Doping cases in athletics
German sportspeople in doping cases